Delhi Daredevils (DD) are a franchise cricket team based in Delhi, India, which plays in the Indian Premier League (IPL). They were one of the eight teams that competed in the 2015 Indian Premier League. They were captained by JP Duminy. Delhi Daredevils finished 7th in the IPL.

Indian Premier League

Standings
Delhi Daredevils finished 7th in the league stage of IPL 2015.

Match log

Statistics

References

Delhi Capitals seasons
2015 Indian Premier League